Giancarlo Galan (born 10 September 1956 in Padua) is an Italian politician.

Political career
After having been an activist of the Italian Liberal Party in the 1970s and the 1980s, he was not active in politics until he joined Forza Italia since its foundation in 1994. In the same year he was elected to the Chamber of Deputies.

In 1995 he ran successfully for President of Veneto. He was re-elected in 2000 and 2005. He did not stand for re-election in 2010, when the centre-right coalition supported Luca Zaia of Liga Veneta–Lega Nord for President.

He was Minister of Agriculture in Silvio Berlusconi's fourth cabinet from 2010 to 2011, filling the place vacated by Zaia. He later served as Minister of Cultural Heritage and Activities for a few months in 2011.

In 2013 he was elected to the Chamber of Deputies and, consequently, chairman of the Culture Committee.

In June 2014 a tribunal in Venice asked the Parliament for an authorization to proceed against Galan for bribery, extortion and money laundering in the framework of the inquiry about the MOSE Project. The Parliament approved the request: Galan was led to a prison in Milan and later granted house arrest in his villa near Padua.

References

External links

Venetist politicians
1956 births
Living people
Politicians from Padua
Italian Liberal Party politicians
Forza Italia politicians
The People of Freedom politicians
Forza Italia (2013) politicians
Agriculture ministers of Italy
Culture ministers of Italy
Deputies of Legislature XII of Italy
Senators of Legislature XV of Italy
Senators of Legislature XVI of Italy
Deputies of Legislature XVII of Italy
Presidents of Veneto
Italian politicians convicted of crimes
Heads of government who were later imprisoned